Tamiang United Football Club (simply known as Tamiang United of TUFC) is an Indonesian football club based in Aceh Tamiang Regency, Aceh. They currently compete in the Liga 3. On 24 November 2017, when the PSSI congress became a momentum for them, at that time Tamiang United was inaugurated as a new member of PSSI and was ready to compete in Indonesian Liga 3 for the first time.

History
Founded in 2017, Tamiang United made club debut into Indonesian football by joining the third-tier league Indonesia Liga 3 in 2019. On 1 August 2019, Tamiang United made their first league match debut in a 1–1 draw against PSBL Langsa. Until the end of the competition, the club was only ranked 5th in the group stage of the Liga 3 Aceh zone.

References

External links
 Tamiang United at Instagram

Football clubs in Aceh
Football clubs in Indonesia
Association football clubs established in 2017
2017 establishments in Indonesia